The Gidabo River is a medium-sized perennial river of south-central Ethiopia within the Great Rift Valley. The Gidabo River catchment area is one of the leading coffee production areas in Ethiopia.

Course 
It is one of three medium-sized rivers discharging into Lake Abaya. It passes the notable town of Yrga Alem. The river turns westward when entering the Gidabo flood plains directly east of Lake Abaya.

In the flood plains and along the final stretch of the river it defines the southern border of the Sidama Zone through which it flows for most of its length. The town of Dilla is the most prominent town in the catchment area of the river. Another town in the catchment area is Aleta Wendo.

Water flow 
The river is not navigable and it has no notable tributaries, but the River basin contains a sizable number of ~97 small rivers and streams in three sub-basins. The average annual discharge at its mouth amounts to 11 m3/s, with peak discharges reaching ~40 m3/s in spring and autumn, while in summer and winter the discharge can drop to 2-3 m3/s. A special feature of the Gidabo catchment area is the existence of a large number of springs, which can be used as groundwater sources for agriculture even during the summer and winter dry seasons.

Gidabo dam 
17 kilometers by road west of Dilla, where the river turns westward before entering its flood plains and marshes, the Gidabo dam, a 21.3 meter high and 350 m wide earth fill embankment dam is used for flood control and for irrigation purposes of an area of 27 km2 downstream as well as for fish production. The storage volume of the dam reservoir amounts to 0.063 km3. The construction of this dam took eight years because of unexpected settlement processes during construction (among other issues) which required to change the dam design and storage volume.

See also 
 List of rivers of Ethiopia
 Dams and reservoirs in Ethiopia

References 

Rivers of Ethiopia